The 1927 Haskell Indians football team was an American football that represented the Haskell Institute (now known as Haskell Indian Nations University) during the 1927 college football season. In its first year under head coach John Webster Thomas, the team compiled a 5–3–1 record. John Levi and Egbert "Egg" Ward were assistant coaches.

Albert Hawley was the team captain.  Five Haskell players were selected by Leslie Edmonds to his 1927 All-Kansas team: Dave Bible as a first-team tackle; Hawley as the first-team center; Fritz as a second-team tackle; Cross as a second-team halfback; and Ward as a third-team guard.

Schedule

References

Haskell
Haskell Indian Nations Fighting Indians football seasons
Haskell Indians football